On the method of dealing with the Rebellious Peoples of Valdichiana is a 1503 work by Niccolò Machiavelli.

A short excerpt in English may be found in Allan Gilbert's Machiavelli Volume One.

In 1503, one year after his missions to Cesare Borgia, Machiavelli wrote a short work, Del modo di trattare i sudditi della Val di Chiana ribellati (On the Way to Deal with the Rebel Subjects of the Valdichiana).  in this work, he contrasts the errors of Florence with the wisdom of the Ancient Romans.  Machiavelli declares that when dealing with rebellious peoples, such as in Valdichiana, the ruler must either placate them or eliminate them.

Machiavelli also witnessed the bloody vengeance taken by Borgia on his mutinous captains at the town of Sinigaglia (December 31, 1502), later writing a famous account. In much of his early writings, Machiavelli argues that “one should not offend a prince and later put faith in him.”

References

Works by Niccolò Machiavelli
1503 books